Nurachi is a comune (municipality) in the Province of Oristano in the Italian region Sardinia, located about  northwest of Cagliari and about  northwest of Oristano.

Nurachi borders the following municipalities: Baratili San Pietro, Cabras, Oristano, Riola Sardo.

Demographic evolution

References

External links

 www.comunenurachi.it/

Cities and towns in Sardinia